The 2011 Molson Canadian Men's Provincial Curling Championship was held February 2–6 at the Miramichi Curling Club in Miramichi, New Brunswick.  The winning team of James Grattan will represent New Brunswick at the 2011 Tim Hortons Brier in London, Ontario.

Teams

Standings

Results

Draw 1
 February 2, 6:30 PM

Draw 2
 February 3, 9:00 AM

Draw 3
 February 3, 2:00 PM

Draw 4
 February 3, 7:00 PM

Draw 5
 February 4, 1:00 PM

Draw 6
 February 4, 6:00 PM

Draw 7
 February 5, 8:00 AM

Playoffs

Semifinal
February 5, 6:00 PM

Final
February 6, 2:30 PM

References

Molson Canadian Men's Provincial Curling Championship
Sport in Miramichi, New Brunswick
Curling competitions in New Brunswick
2011 in New Brunswick